The Order of Merit is a Malaysian federal award presented for those who have made significant contributions in art, science or humanity and are renowned at national and international level. This award was instituted on 26 June 1975.

About the award 

This order does not carry any title and is conferred on Malaysian citizens only. The recipients are those who have made significant contributions in art, science or humanity and are renowned at national and international level. This award is limited to ten living recipients only at any time and to date there have only been two recipients. It is worn around the neck.

The badge of the Order of Merit is round. On the surface is a white circle with the Malaysian Crest engraved in the centre and surmounted by the slogan "Bakti Untuk Negara" (English: Serve the Nation). The circle is enclosed by another circle and in between the two circles are five-pointed stars enclosed by a crescent moon. The badge suspends from a ribbon which has green and yellow stripes. The narrow stripes are yellow while the broader stripes are green.

Recipients
Official source

D.B.
 2008: Nicol Ann David 
 2009: Lee Chong Wei

References

External links 
 Malaysia: Order of Merit

 
Merit of Malaysia
Awards established in 1975
1975 establishments in Malaysia
Orders of merit